Maidenhead Rugby Football Club is an English rugby union team based in Maidenhead in Berkshire. The club run four senior teams. The first XV play in London & South East Premier, following their promotion from South West 1 East in 2017. The second XV play in Berks/Bucks & Oxon 1, the third XV play in Berks/Bucks & Oxon 3 South and the fourth XV play in Berks/Bucks & Oxon 3 North. The club also runs a veterans side, a ladies team and the full range of junior sides.

History
Maidenhead RFC was formed in February 1922. The club was placed in South West 1 when the national league system was introduced in 1987 and apart from one season in National League 4 (1989–90) the club has been in either SW1 or SW2 until promotion to National League 3 South in 2009–10. The club was only in that league for one season but returned to National 3 South West in 2012.

Honours
1st team:
South West Division 1 East champions (4): 2003–04, 2008–09, 2010–11, 2016–17

3rd team:
Berks/Bucks & Oxon 1 South champions: 2008–09

References

External links
 Official club website

English rugby union teams
Maidenhead
Rugby clubs established in 1922
Rugby union in Berkshire